Doriana Nashelly Aguilar Omeir (born 2 January 1994) is a Nicaraguan footballer who plays as a forward for the Nicaragua women's national team.

Early life
Aguilar was born in Bluefields.

International goals
Scores and results list Nicaragua's goal tally first

References 

1994 births
Living people
People from Bluefields
Nicaraguan women's footballers
Women's association football forwards
Nicaragua women's international footballers
Central American Games silver medalists for Nicaragua
Central American Games medalists in football